This is a list of pottery and ceramic terms.

Definitions in Wiktionary are noted as "(W)".

A

B 

 (W)

 (W)

C

D

E

F

G

H

I

J

K

L

M

O

P 

Published definitions of Pottery include:
-- "All fired ceramic wares that contain clay when formed, except technical, structural, and refractory products." 
-- "China, earthenware and any article made from clay or from a mixture containing clay and other materials." 
-- "A class of ceramic artifacts in which clay is formed into containers by hand or in molds or with a potter's wheel, often decorated, and fired" 
-- "The term pottery includes many varieties of ware from the crudest vessels of prehistoric times to the most beautiful decorated porcelains, stoneware and earthenware; it also includes many articles such as large grain-jars used in ancient times for storing corn and other dry materials, wine-jars and modern sanitaryware and the large tanks for containing corrosive acids. Many kinds of earthenware, stoneware and porcelains are used for scientific and experimental purposes as well as electrical apparatus, insulators, switch-bases, sparking plugs and bases or frames for electrical heating appliances."

Q

R

S

T

U

V

W

Notes

References
Savage, George, and Newman, Harold, An Illustrated Dictionary of Ceramics, 1985, Thames & Hudson, 
ASTM Standard C242-00. Standard Terminology of Ceramic Whitewares and Related Products.
Dictionary of Ceramics 3rd edition. Dodd A., Murfin D., The Institute of Materials. 1994.
Whitewares: Production, Testing And Quality Control. Ryan W. & Radford C., Pergamon Press. 1987
An Introduction To The Technology Of Pottery. Rado P., Pergamon Press. 1969
Pottery Science: Materials, Process And Products. Dinsdale A., Ellis Horwood. 1986

Pottery
Pottery terms
Wikipedia glossaries using description lists